Balkaram Sagram (born 2 January 1950) is a Trinidadian cricketer. He played in 32 first-class matches for Trinidad and Tobago from 1971 to 1983.

See also
 List of Trinidadian representative cricketers

References

External links
 

1950 births
Living people
Trinidad and Tobago cricketers